Biton (Hebrew: ביטון) is a Maghrebi Jewish surname which is common in Israel. It may refer to:

 Avraham Biton (1923-2005), Israeli politician
 Charlie Biton (born 1947), former Israeli politician
 Dan Biton (born 1961), general in the Israel Defense Forces
 Dudu Biton (1988), Israeli footballer
 Erez Biton (born 1942), Israeli poet born in Oran
 Haim Biton, Israeli politician
 Michael Biton, Israeli politician
 Moshe Biton (born 1982), Israeli footballer
 Nir Biton (born 1991), Israeli footballer
 Ori Biton (born 1987), Israeli footballer
 Yifat Shasha-Biton (born 1973), Israeli educator and politician
 Yifat Bitton (born 1971), Israeli law professor

See also
 Eyal Golan (born Eyal Biton), Israeli singer
 Bitòn Coulibaly (1689? – 1755), founder of the Bambara Empire
 Biton (disambiguation)

 Bitton
 Byton

Maghrebi Jewish surnames